Arjun Pandit may refer to:

People
 Arjun Pandit (athlete), Nepalese marathon runner

Other
 Arjun Pandit, novel by  Balai Chand Mukhopadhyay
 Arjun Pandit (1976 film)
 Arjun Pandit (1999 film)